Sylvester Mhoja Kasulumbayi (born 1 January 1950) is a Tanzanian CHADEMA politician and Member of Parliament for Maswa East constituency since 2010.

References

1950 births
Living people
Chadema MPs
Tanzanian MPs 2010–2015
Tanzanian schoolteachers